= Brother Ray =

Brother Ray may refer to:

- Bubba Ray Dudley (Mark LoMonaco, born 1971), American professional wrestler, former ring name Brother Ray
- Ray Charles (1930–2004), American singer, songwriter, and pianist, nicknamed Brother Ray
